New Zealand Speleological Society is a national organisation for recreational cavers in New Zealand.

It was formed in 1949 by Henry Lambert and had approximately 300 members in 2010.

Mission
Their stated mission is:
 To be the national speleological body
 To conserve caves and karst
 To represent the interests of its members

By:
 The collection and appropriate dissemination of information on caves, karst and caving
 Advocating conservation and awareness to cave owners and managers
 Negotiating access to caves for members
 The promotion of safe cave use
 Operating a national cave search and rescue system
 Encouraging cave users to join NZSS
 Monitoring the effects of cave use

Through:
 Education and training
 Development and assessment of techniques and equipment
 Liaison with other groups and agencies
 Exploration and study of caves
The society also maintains the library at the Waitomo Caves Museum.

See also
Caving in New Zealand

References

External links
NZSS website

Caving organizations
Speleological
Caving in New Zealand